Borut Plaskan (born 8 August 1966) is a Slovenian retired professional handball player.

He played 48 games for the national handball team of Slovenia.

References

1966 births
Living people
Sportspeople from Slovenj Gradec
Slovenian male handball players